An American Werewolf in London is a 1981 comedy horror film written and directed by John Landis. An international co-production of the United Kingdom and the United States, the film stars David Naughton, Jenny Agutter, Griffin Dunne and John Woodvine. The title is a cross between An American in Paris and Werewolf of London. The film's plot follows two American backpackers, David and Jack, who are attacked by a werewolf while travelling in England, causing David to become a werewolf under the next full moon.

Landis wrote the first draft of the screenplay for the film in 1969 and shelved it for over a decade. Prospective financiers believed that Landis' script was too frightening to be a comedy film and too humorous to be a horror film. After achieving success in Hollywood with the comedies The Kentucky Fried Movie, National Lampoon's Animal House and The Blues Brothers, Landis was able to secure financing from PolyGram Pictures to produce An American Werewolf in London.

An American Werewolf in London was released in the US by Universal Pictures on August 21, 1981. It was a critical and commercial success, winning the 1981 Saturn Award for Best Horror Film and the first ever Academy Award for Best Makeup. Since its release, it has become a cult classic. A sequel, An American Werewolf in Paris, was released by Hollywood Pictures in 1997.

Plot 

Two American backpackers from New York City, David Kessler and Jack Goodman, are trekking across the moors in Yorkshire. As night falls, they stop at the Slaughtered Lamb, a local pub. Jack notices a five-pointed star on the pub's wall, but when he asks about it, the pub-goers grow hostile and he and David  leave. The pub-goers warn them to keep to the road, stay clear of the moors and beware the full moon. David and Jack wander off the road onto the moors and are attacked by a vicious creature. Jack is mauled to death and David is injured. The beast is shot and killed by some of the pub-goers after the barmaid implores them to help the two young men. Instead of a dead animal, David sees the corpse of a naked man lying next to him, before passing out.

David wakes up three weeks later in a London hospital. He is interviewed by police Inspector Villiers, who tells him that he and Jack were attacked by an escaped lunatic. David insists they were attacked by some sort of rabid dog or wolf. An undead Jack appears to David and explains that they were attacked by a werewolf; since David was bitten, he is now a werewolf too. Jack is cursed to walk the earth in limbo, neither dead nor alive, until the wolf's bloodline is severed. Jack urges David to kill himself before the next full moon to prevent him from inflicting the same fate on anyone else.

Dr. Hirsch visits the Slaughtered Lamb to investigate. When asked about the incident, the pub-goers deny any knowledge of David, Jack or the attack. One distraught pub-goer speaks to Dr. Hirsch outside the pub and says David should not have been taken away from the village since he will endanger other people when he transforms.

Upon his release from hospital, David moves into the London flat of Alex Price, a pretty young nurse who grew fond of him while treating him. They have sex and Alex tells David that she is worried about his mental state. Jack, in a more advanced stage of decay, appears to warn David that he will become a werewolf the next night. Jack again advises David to kill himself to avoid killing innocent people, but David refuses to believe him. When the full moon rises, David transforms into a werewolf, and prowls the streets and the London Underground, killing six people. He wakes up the next morning naked on the floor of a wolf enclosure at the London Zoo, with no recollection of what happened, and returns to Alex's flat.

After realizing that he is responsible for the previous night's murders, David unsuccessfully attempts to get himself arrested in Trafalgar Square. He
calls his family from a Piccadilly Circus phone booth to say he loves them, but he loses the courage to slit his wrists with a pocket knife. David sees Jack, in an even more advanced stage of decay, outside an adult movie theatre. Inside, Jack introduces David to his victims from the previous night, some of whom are furious with David and suggest different suicide methods to free them from their undead state.

David transforms into a werewolf again inside the cinema. He decapitates Inspector Villiers and wreaks havoc in the streets, causing the deaths of several motorists and bystanders. The police eventually surround and trap David in an alleyway. Alex runs down the alley and tries to calm David by telling him that she loves him. Although David's consciousness appears to recognize her for a moment, he lunges forward and is shot by the police. Alex cries while staring at David, reverted to human form, lying naked and dead on the ground.

Cast

Production

Development 

John Landis came up with the story while he worked in Yugoslavia as a production assistant on the film Kelly's Heroes (1970). He and a Yugoslav member of the crew were driving in the back of a car on location when they came across a group of Romani people. The Romani people appeared to be performing rituals on a man being buried so that he would not "rise from the grave." This made Landis realize he would never be able to confront the undead and gave him the idea for a film in which a man would go through the same thing.

Landis wrote the first draft of An American Werewolf in London in 1969 and shelved it for over a decade. Two years later, Landis wrote, directed, and starred in his debut film, Schlock, which developed a cult following. Landis developed box-office status in Hollywood through the successful comedy films The Kentucky Fried Movie, National Lampoon's Animal House and The Blues Brothers before securing $10 million financing from PolyGram Pictures for his werewolf film. Financiers believed that Landis' script was too frightening to be a comedy and too funny to be a horror film. Universal Studios execs were pressuring the director to cast Dan Aykroyd and John Belushi as David Kessler and Jack Goodman but Landis went with unknown actors instead.

Filming 
Filming took place between February and March 1981 because director John Landis wanted the film to take place during poor weather.

The Angel of Death statue was a prop added for the film, but the red phone box is real, though the Welsh road signs were covered by a fake tree.

The pub shown in the film known as the Slaughtered Lamb was actually a cottage located in Crickadarn, and the interior scenes were filmed in the Black Swan, Old Lane, Martyrs Green in Surrey.

An American Werewolf in London was the first film allowed to shoot in Piccadilly Circus in 15 years. Landis accomplished this by inviting 300 members of London's Metropolitan Police Service to a screening of his new film The Blues Brothers. The police were so impressed by his work that they granted the production a two-night filming permit between the hours of 1 and 4 a.m. Traffic was stopped only three times for two-minute increments to film the automobile stunts involving the double-decker bus. Other filming locations included Putney General Hospital, Chiswick Maternity Hospital, Redcliffe Square in Earl's Court, the area around Tower Bridge, Tottenham Court Road Underground station, London Zoo, Putney High Street, Belgravia and Southwark.

Filming also took place at Twickenham Film Studios in Richmond Upon Thames.

Music 
The film's ironically upbeat soundtrack consists of songs which refer to the moon. Bobby Vinton's slow, soothing version of "Blue Moon" plays during the opening credits, Van Morrison's "Moondance" plays as David and Alex make love for the first time, Creedence Clearwater Revival's "Bad Moon Rising" plays as David nears the moment of changing to the werewolf, a soft, bittersweet ballad version of "Blue Moon" by Sam Cooke plays during the agonizing wolf transformation, and the Marcels' doo-wop version of "Blue Moon" plays over the end credits.

The score was composed and conducted by Elmer Bernstein and recorded at Olympic Studios in London, engineered by Keith Grant. Bernstein's score can be heard during David's nightmares, when Dr. Hirsch drives through the moors to East Proctor, and when Alex confronts David in the alley. Though Bernstein wrote and recorded music to accompany the transformation scene, the director chose not to use it. The three-minute passage was eventually released by Bernstein under the title "Metamorphosis".

Release

Theatrical run

Home media 
The film was first released in 1981 on VHS and Betamax under the MCA Videocassette Inc. label and on LaserDisc and CED under the MCA Videodisc label. In 1984, MCA Home Video released it on LaserDisc. This would be the last time Universal would release the movie on home video for 17 years. The following year, Vestron Video acquired the video rights from MCA/Universal and released it on VHS, Betamax and LaserDisc in 1985. It was released again on LaserDisc in 1989 (under Image Entertainment through Vestron) and 1995 (under LIVE Entertainment), and again on VHS in 1990 under the Video Treasures label and 1991 and 1994 from Vestron Video (through LIVE Home Video).

The film was first released on DVD in December 1997 by LIVE Entertainment according to a LIVE DVD Advertisement. It was presented in a non-anamorphic widescreen transfer and contained the film's theatrical teaser trailer. Universal eventually got the video rights back and released a 20th-anniversary "Collector's Edition" DVD on September 18, 2001, making it the first time Universal released the film on home video since 1984. It included an audio commentary with actors David Naughton and Griffin Dunne, interviews with John Landis and Rick Baker, a 1981 promotional featurette, silent outtakes, storyboards and production photographs. A coinciding VHS was released on the same day. The high-definition version of the film was first released on HD DVD by Universal on November 28, 2006. A high-definition Blu-ray Disc and 2-disc standard-definition Region 1 DVD release of the film titled An American Werewolf in London – Full Moon Edition was released by Universal on September 15, 2009. The Region 2 DVDs and Blu-ray were released on September 28 and are known as An American Werewolf in London – Special Edition.

The Region 2 DVD release does not include a scene that is fully intact on the Region 1 release and all previous Region 1 and 2 releases. The scene takes place near the end of the film where the character of David calls his parents from a public telephone box. All but the end of this scene had been cut from the Region 2 release due to a mastering error.

As of October 2009, Universal said that they were scrapping all existing faulty stock and issuing replacement DVDs. All Blu-ray releases, however, are intact.

In 2016, Universal re-released the film on Blu-ray as a "Restored Edition" to commemorate the 35th anniversary of the film's release. On October 29, 2019, Arrow Video released a 4K restoration as part of a Blu-ray box set that contains all previously released extra material; the documentary Mark of The Beast: The Legacy of the Universal Werewolf; the 2009 making-of documentary Beware the Moon; filmmaker Jon Spira's video essay "I Think He's a Jew: The Werewolf's Secret;" a new interview with Landis; lobby cards and a booklet.

Reception

Box office 
An American Werewolf in London was released August 21, 1981, and grossed $30 million at the box office in the United States and $62 million worldwide against the budget of $5.8 million.

Critical response 
The site's critical consensus states: "Terrifying and funny in almost equal measure, John Landis' horror-comedy crosses genres while introducing Rick Baker's astounding make-up effects." On Metacritic, the film has a score of 55 out of 100 based on reviews from 15 critics, indicating "mixed or average reviews". Kim Newman of Empire magazine gave the film a rating of four out of five stars, writing that "carnivorous lunar activities rarely come any more entertaining than this". Tom Huddleston of Time Out also gave the film a positive review, calling it "not just gory but actually frightening, not just funny but clever".

Halliwell's Film Guide described the film as a "curious but oddly endearing mixture of horror film and spoof, of comedy and shock, with everything grist to its mill including tourist Britain and the wedding of Prince Charles. The special effects are notable and signalled new developments in this field." Entertainment Weekly listed it in their 1996 "Greatest Movies Ever Made", saying that the transformation effects by Rick Baker changed the face of horror makeup in the 1980s.

Roger Ebert's review was less favourable; he gave it two out of four stars and stated that "An American Werewolf in London seems curiously unfinished, as if director John Landis spent all his energy on spectacular set pieces and then didn't want to bother with things like transitions, character development or an ending."

In his book Comedy-Horror Films: A Chronological History, 1914-2008, Bruce G. Hallenbeck lambasted the film's inconsistent tone, juvenile humor, poor direction, and emphasis on shock value to the detriment of continuity and plot. He cited Rick Baker's makeup effects and Jenny Agutter's performance as genuinely powerful, but concluded that "thanks to the director's insincerity, slapdash approach and what appears to be a thinly veiled contempt for the material, [An American Werewolf in London] succeeds neither as comedy nor as horror."

Accolades 
At the 54th Academy Awards, An American Werewolf in London won the first-ever Academy Award for Best Makeup. During the 1982 Saturn Awards, the film won for Best Horror Film and Best Makeup and nominated for Best Actress and Best Writing.

A 2008 Empire magazine poll of critics and readers named An American Werewolf in London as the 107th-greatest film of all time.

Legacy

Media recognition 
An American Werewolf in London is chiefly appreciated as a milestone in the comedy-horror genre and for its innovative makeup effects.  The Daily Telegraph stated that it was "the first mainstream hit which managed to make its gross-out effects simultaneously shocking and hilarious" and called the signature werewolf transformation scene "stunningly ingenious, without a computer effect in sight, but also suffused with squirm-inducing agony." The Telegraph also cited the slew of 1980s genre films which came after An American Werewolf in London and followed the film's example of blending visceral horror effects with comedy, such as Beetlejuice, Gremlins and Evil Dead 2.  Director Edgar Wright (Shaun of the Dead) cited the movie as a major inspiration for his own film-making and a milestone in the genre. The low budget independent movie The Snarling (2018) was heavily inspired by Landis's film and contains various motifs and references including a cameo by Albert Moses paying direct tribute to his role in the film.

Pat Reid of Empire, reviewing the film in 2000, thought that the blending of comedic and horror elements "don't always sit well side-by-side," but called the transformation scene "undoubtedly a classic" because of its "good old-fashioned makeup and trickery making the incredible seem real."

Rolling Stones Joshua Rothkopf, writing on the 35th anniversary of the film's release, called An American Werewolf in London an "allegory of exoticized Jewishness". This is embodied by the character of David and his growing awareness of his "otherness" as a werewolf alongside his own outsider status as a Jewish American in England. "Hiding a secret deep within one's body, strange urges, xenophobic glances, accusatory feelings of guilt: David's condition already has a name, and this won't be the first film in which Jewish otherness is made monstrous." The article also celebrated the film as an innovative mix of humor and horror, "a landmark in startling makeup effects", and "a riotous piece of fish-out-of-water college humor."

Michael Jackson, who was a fan of the film, chose John Landis to direct and Rick Baker to direct makeup effects for his 1983 "Thriller" music video based on the strength of their work in An American Werewolf in London. It went on to become one of the most lauded music videos of all time.

Director's regrets 
Director John Landis has expressed regret over changing, and even cutting, certain sequences from the final cut of the film in order to earn an R rating in the United States. The sex scene between Alex and David was edited to be less explicit, and an extended scene showing the homeless men along the Thames being attacked by the werewolf was eliminated after a test audience reacted negatively to it. Another showed the undead Jack eating a piece of toast which falls out of his torn throat. Landis also concluded that the werewolf transformation scene should have been shorter—he was so fascinated by the quality of Rick Baker's effects that he spent more time on the scene than he otherwise would have.

Radio adaptation 
A radio adaptation of the film was broadcast on BBC Radio 1 in 1997, produced by Dirk Maggs and featuring Jenny Agutter, Brian Glover and John Woodvine reprising the roles of Alex Price, the chess player (now named George Hackett, and with a more significant role as East Proctor's special constable) and Dr. Hirsch, respectively. The roles of David and Jack were played by Eric Meyers and William Dufris.

Sequel 
The film was followed by a sequel, An American Werewolf in Paris, released in 1997. The sequel features a completely different cast and crew, and was distributed by Disney's Hollywood Pictures. It was poorly received by critics and flopped at the box office.

Retrospective documentary 
In 2009, a retrospective documentary film, Beware the Moon: Remembering An American Werewolf in London, was released. An accompanying book by the documentary's director, Paul Davis, was published in 2016.

Proposed remake 
In June 2009, it was announced that Dimension Films was working with producers Sean and Bryan Furst on a remake of the film. This has since been delayed due to other commitments. In August 2016, several reports suggested that Max Landis (son of director John Landis) was considering remaking the film. In November 2016, Deadline Hollywood reported that Max Landis would write and direct a remake.

In December 2017, Max Landis confirmed on Twitter that he had completed the first draft of the script. But beginning in late 2017, accusations by a number of women that Landis had abused them emotionally or sexually began to emerge publicly. In the wake of those allegations, it remains unknown if Landis will be replaced or if the project will be put on indefinite hold.

In November 2019, Variety reported that Robert Kirkman, creator of The Walking Dead comic book series, was in consideration to serve as a producer for a new reboot of An American Werewolf in London.

See also 
 "Deer Woman", a 2005 episode of Masters of Horror directed by Landis that references events in An American Werewolf in London as though they are actually happening
 Frostbiten, a 2006 Swedish vampire film influenced in part by An American Werewolf in London
 Junoon, a 1992 Bollywood film with a similar plot to An American Werewolf in London

References

External links 

 
 
 
 
 Site dedicated to the film, including extensive location details (defunct)
 The London Underground in Films & Television
 An American Werewolf in London script

1980s American films
1980s black comedy films
1980s British films
1980s comedy horror films
1980s English-language films
1980s exploitation films
1980s monster movies
1981 comedy films
1981 films
1981 horror films
American black comedy films
American comedy horror films
American exploitation films
American ghost films
American werewolf films
American supernatural horror films
British black comedy films
British comedy horror films
British supernatural horror films
British werewolf films
Films about death
Films about vacationing
Films adapted into radio programs
Films directed by John Landis
Films produced by George Folsey Jr.
Films scored by Elmer Bernstein
Films set in London
Films set in Yorkshire
Films set on the London Underground
Films shot in London
Films shot in Surrey
Films shot in Wales
Films that won the Academy Award for Best Makeup
Films with screenplays by John Landis
PolyGram Filmed Entertainment films
Universal Monsters
Universal Pictures films